The qualification for the 2016 Women's Olympic volleyball tournament was held from 22 August 2015 to 22 May 2016. Twelve teams qualified, the hosts, the FIVB World Cup champion and runner-up, five continental Olympic qualification tournament champions, and four teams from the World Olympic qualification tournament respectively. Teams already qualified for the event were not eligible to play in the following qualification tournaments.

Qualification summary

Means of qualification

Pool standing procedure

For all qualification tournaments
 Number of matches won
 Match points
 Sets ratio
 Points ratio
 Result of the last match between the tied teams
Match won 3–0 or 3–1: 3 match points for the winner, 0 match points for the loser
Match won 3–2: 2 match points for the winner, 1 match point for the loser

For North American qualification tournament only
 Number of matches won
 Match points
 Points ratio
 Sets ratio
 Result of the last match between the tied teams
Match won 3–0: 5 match points for the winner, 0 match points for the loser
Match won 3–1: 4 match points for the winner, 1 match point for the loser
Match won 3–2: 3 match points for the winner, 2 match points for the loser

Host country

FIVB reserved a vacancy for the Olympics host country to participate in the tournament.

FIVB World cup

The winners and runners-up from 2015 FIVB Volleyball World Cup qualified for the Olympics.

Venue: 
Dates: 22 August – 6 September 2015

Continental qualification tournaments

Africa

African Olympic Qualification Tournament
The winners qualified for the 2016 Olympic Games. The second and third teams would play in World Olympic Qualification Tournament.

Venue:  Yaoundé Multipurpose Sports Complex, Yaoundé, Cameroon
Dates: 12–16 February 2016

Asia and Oceania

Asian Olympic Qualification Tournament
The Asian Olympic qualification tournament combined with World Olympic qualification tournaments. The host teams and the top three ranked teams from the World ranking as of 1 January 2016 competed in the tournament. The top ranked among the four teams qualified as Asian Olympic Qualification Tournament winners.

Europe

European Olympic Qualification TournamentThe winners qualified for the 2016 Olympic Games. The second and third teams would play in World Olympic Qualification Tournament.

Venue:  Başkent Volleyball Hall, Ankara, Turkey
Dates: 4–9 January 2016

North America

NORCECA Olympic Qualification Tournament The top four ranked teams from the 2015 NORCECA Volleyball Championship competed in this tournament. The winners qualified for the 2016 Olympic Games. The second and third teams would play in the World Olympic Qualification Tournament.
Venue:  Pinnacle Bank Arena, Lincoln, Nebraska, United States
Dates: 7–9 January 2016
All times are Central Time (UTC−06:00).

South America

South American Olympic Qualification Tournament
The winners qualified for the 2016 Olympic Games. The second and third teams would play in World Olympic Qualification Tournament.
Venue:  Bomberos Voluntarios Stadium, Bariloche, Argentina
Dates: 6–10 January 2016
All times are Argentina Standard Time (UTC−03:00).

World Qualification tournaments
There were 2 tournaments to get 5 remaining spots in the 2016 Olympic Games. Only the teams which had not yet qualified from the 3 events above could play in the tournament. 12 teams had rights to play in this tournament, Japan as a host of 1st tournament, the top three Asian teams from World ranking as of 1 January 2016, and the 2nd and 3rd place from continental qualification tournaments. The 1st tournament was combined with the Asian Olympic qualification tournament which played in Japan. The best ranked Asian team qualified for the 2016 Olympic Games. The best three ranked teams, excluding the best Asian team, also secured the vacancies in the 2016 Olympic Games. The 2nd tournament which was held in Puerto Rico consisted of 4 teams, and only the best ranked team could take the last spot for the 2016 Olympic Games. The table below showed the allocation of 12 qualified teams.

 withdrew from the tournament. Therefore, as the fourth place team in the African qualifier, replaced .

1st Tournament

Venue:  Tokyo Metropolitan Gymnasium, Tokyo, Japan
Dates: 14–22 May 2016
All times are Japan Standard Time (UTC+09:00).

Individual Awards

Best Outside Spiker

Best Opposite

Best Middle Blocker

Best Setter

Best Libero

2nd Tournament

Venue:  Roberto Clemente Coliseum, San Juan, Puerto Rico
Dates: 20–22 May 2016
All times are Central Daylight Time (UTC−04:00).

See also

Volleyball at the 2016 Summer Olympics – Men's qualification

References

External links
Qualification System
Qualification Website
North American Olympic Qualification Website
South American Olympic Qualification Website
World Olympic Qualification Tournament, Japan
World Olympic Qualification Tournament, Puerto Rico

Olympic Qualification Women
Olympic Qualification Women

2016
Women's events at the 2016 Summer Olympics